Vic Parsons (born November 29, 1939) is a retired Canadian NASCAR driver from Willowdale, Ontario (a suburb of Toronto). He competed in nineteen Winston Cup Series events in his career with seven top-tens.

Cup career
Parsons made his debut in 1972, making the show at North Wilkesboro Speedway with a 19th place qualifying effort. Parsons then survived the tough short track and ended up with a top-10 in his first career race-9th.

Parsons stepped it up to eighteen races in 1973, when he finished 30th in the points standings. Driving for car owner, Bill Seifer, Parsons recorded an unprecedented six top-tens. That included a career best 7th place in the July race at Daytona. The other top-tens were a trio of ninths and a duo of tenths. However, the news was not all good for Parsons. Even with six top-tens, Parsons' team struggled to finish races. In fact, in eighteen starts, Parsons' team only finished seven of them. This would lead to Parsons not being re-hired for the 1974 season and his permanent departure from the NASCAR scene.

See also
List of Canadians in NASCAR

References

External links
 

1939 births
Living people
Canadian racing drivers
NASCAR drivers
Racing drivers from Ontario
People from Willowdale, Toronto
Sportspeople from North York